On 18 April 2014,  seracs on the western spur of Mount Everest failed, resulting in an ice avalanche that killed sixteen climbing Sherpas in the Khumbu Icefall. This was the same icefall where the 1970 Mount Everest disaster had taken place. Thirteen bodies were recovered within two days, while the remaining three were never recovered due to the great danger of performing such an expedition.  Many Sherpas were angered by what they saw as the Nepalese government's meager offer of compensation to victims' families, and threatened a protest or strike. On 22 April, the Sherpas announced they would not work on Everest for the remainder of 2014 as a mark of respect for the victims.

Background

Guide employment on Mount Everest

A Sherpa who works as a porter specialised in high-altitude work including rope fixing on Mount Everest typically earns about US$125/day per climb. Most come from climbing families, are raised on stories of wealth from climbs, with relatively few other economic opportunities. Between 350 and 450 such people, mostly from the Sherpa ethnic group, work each year's climbing season. (They are all referred to as "Sherpas" regardless of specific ethnicity.) As such, they can earn up to $5,000 a year, compared with Nepal's average annual salary of $700.

In the years prior to the disaster, foreigners began bringing their own guides, causing tension with locals. Eight people, including one of the most experienced Sherpa guides, died on Mount Everest in 2013.

Concerns over Khumbu Icefall route

The presence of numerous unstable blocks of ice (called seracs) in and above the Khumbu Icefall encourages climbers to try to pass through as quickly as possible, usually in the very early morning before temperatures rise and loosen the ice. In the spring of 2012 Russell Brice, of the guiding company Himex, called off guided ascents run by his company due to safety concerns. "When I see around 50 people moving underneath the cliff at one time," he commented, "it scares me." However, Brice and Himex returned to the south side of Everest for the 2014 climbing season. Mountaineer Alan Arnette reported that this ice bulge had been a known hazard for years and had discharged ice into the Khumbu Icefall almost every season. He added that, "In 2012 it narrowly missed many climbers." According to writer and mountaineer Jon Krakauer, the 2014 ice avalanche was triggered when a block of ice "the size of a Beverly Hills mansion" broke off from the bulge.

Conditions change regularly with the glacier's shifting ice, so climbing guides must find and maintain a new route through the icefall each season.

Ice avalanche
Twenty-five men, mostly Sherpas, were buried in the avalanche. The group was fixing ropes and preparing the South Col route for fee-paying climbers during the upcoming climbing season. The accident zone, locally known as "the Golden Gate" or "Popcorn Field", lies within the Khumbu Icefall.

The ice avalanche came from a large serac breaking off on the slopes of Mount Everest's western shoulder. Despite most reporting, this was not an avalanche in the usual sense of the word as there was little snow involved and the large blocks of serac ice behave much more like  a rockfall. The serac was estimated to have been 34.5 meters (113 ft) thick and to have had a mass of 14,300 tonnes (31.5 million pounds). Though there have been calls for construction of defensive structures, they are impossible on the scale necessary.

Victims

Sixteen people died in the disaster. Thirteen bodies were recovered within 48 hours, when search and rescue operations were called off due to "too much risk". Nine other guides were also injured, including three who required intensive-care hospitalisation.

Four fatalities were Sherpas from Nepal's Solukhumbu District. Five were working for Discovery Channel, preparing for an upcoming special in which Joby Ogwyn was planning to attempt a BASE jump from the mountain. No foreigners were killed. According to mountaineer Tim Rippel, the victims were moving slowly and carrying large "loads of equipment, tents, stoves, oxygen and so on up to stock camps" when the avalanche occurred.  The Sherpas had started out in early morning but were delayed by poor climbing conditions.  The second unit crew of disaster movie Everest (2015) were filming nearby, but suffered no injuries or fatalities; Sherpas involved with the film's production gave assistance after the avalanche. In total, the search and rescue team included nine Sherpas and three foreigners.

The 2014 disaster is the second-deadliest disaster in Everest's history, only superseded by avalanches that struck the southern side of the mountain the following year, on 25 April 2015, triggered by a magnitude 7.8 earthquake in Nepal.

Reactions
Rippel reported "everyone is shaken here at base camp".  Some of the climbers immediately packed up their belongings and left.

In addition to mandatory insurance policies paying US$10,000 to guides' families, the Nepalese government announced compensation of Nepali Rs. 40,000 ($400) each as immediate relief to the victims' next of kin. This government offering, which only covers funeral costs, angered Sherpas and was dismissed by the Nepal Mountaineering Association (NMA). The NMA announced they would stop work in seven days' time if compensation of US$10,000 were not paid to families of the dead, injured and missing. They further demanded a memorial to the dead, the doubling of insurance coverage to $20,000 and government payment of medical bills.  According to unverified reports, 350 guides voted to suspend operations on Everest.  Other reports said the guides agreed to unspecified "strong protests".

On 21 April, eight of the dead were ceremoniously driven through Kathmandu and then cremated in a Buddhist religious ceremony. On 22 April, the Sherpas announced they would not work on Everest for the rest of 2014 out of respect for the victims. Tulsi Gurung said: "We had a long meeting this afternoon and we decided to stop our climbing this year to honour our fallen brothers. All Sherpas are united in this." The fate of 334 climbing permits sold at $10,000 each is uncertain.  By 24 April, almost all expeditions had decided to abandon their climbing plans; the 600 mountaineers who were at Base Camp before the avalanche was down to 40 or 50.

On 23 April, the Nepalese government announced it would give an additional 500,000 Nepali Rs. (approx. US$5,100) to the families of the dead climbers. Although these funds started to be paid in December 2014, it was reported in January 2015 that the bereaved Sherpa families were further angered because the money could only be obtained if they  presented documentation in Kathmandu, which is impossible for many of those who live in the Khumbu region.

Discovery cancelled Ogwyn's planned BASE jump shortly after the ice avalanche struck, and announced it would broadcast a documentary about the tragedy.  Entitled Everest Avalanche Tragedy, the 90-minute programme was shown on 4 May.  The company also said it would make a donation to the American Himalayan Foundation Sherpa Family Fund, a charity supporting the families of those who died in the disaster.

Following the accident, the NMA president Ang Tsering Sherpa proposed installing avalanche-prevention barriers similar to those found above European ski resorts. He said: "We should ... adopt some precautionary measure – learning from [how] mountains [are managed] in developed countries where they adopt measures to avoid avalanches by putting some kind of wood or some concrete so that it helps make it safe." It is very doubtful however if any defensive structures are feasible for events of this size.

The 2015 documentary Sherpa explores reactions to the avalanche after filmmakers were on location when it occurred.

Effects and aftermath

Post-disaster ascents in 2014
The first post-avalanche ascent of Mount Everest via the South Col route was on 23 May 2014, by Chinese businesswoman Wang Jing, together with five sherpas. She made her ascent without new rope lines, and beyond the usual 14:00 cut-off time, and made her descent in the dark. Tamding Sherpa, the leader of the team that Wang was planning to use before her original expedition was called off as a result of the disaster, stated that he considered her ascent to be "cheating".

Changes in 2015
As a result of the dangers of the normal route up the left side of the icefall, the Nepali authorities announced in February 2015 that a new route, up the centre of the icefall, would be followed instead. According to the director of the Nepali government’s Department of Tourism, Tulasi Prasad Gautam, "In response to the last year’s avalanche we are trying to make Everest climbing a little safer by avoiding the old route."

In addition, the insurance for each Sherpa in 2015 was raised to $15,000 from $11,000.

See also
 List of deaths on eight-thousanders
 List of people who died climbing Mount Everest
 1970 Mount Everest disaster
 Sherpa (film)

References

External links
 EverestAvalancheTragedy.com is Discovery's site on the disaster and donations to victims of it.

2014 in Nepal
2014 natural disasters
2014
Mountaineering disasters
Natural disasters in Nepal
April 2014 events in Asia
Avalanches in Nepal
2010s avalanches
2014 disasters in Nepal